Federalist No. 19 is an essay by James Madison, the nineteenth of The Federalist Papers. It was published on December 8, 1787, under the pseudonym Publius, the name under which all The Federalist papers were published. No. 19 addresses the failures of the Articles of Confederation to satisfactorily govern the United States; it is the fifth of six essays on this topic. It is titled "The Same Subject Continued: The Insufficiency of the Present Confederation to Preserve the Union". Contemporary comparisons are made with "the Germanic body" (the Kingdom of Germany), a community of sovereigns that support a feeble and precarious union; Poland, unfit for self-government and self-defense; and Switzerland, in practice a severed league due to differences of religion.

External links 

 Text of The Federalist No. 19: congress.gov

1787 in American law
19
1787 essays
1787 in the United States